Wadi Abdoun (Arabic: وادي عبدون) is a wadi (Arabic meaning valley or stream bed) in Amman, Jordan. The wadi separates the two neighbourhoods of Jabal Amman and Abdoun. The Abdoun Bridge spans the valley, connecting the 4th Circle and Abdoun Circle on either side. The creek in the base of Wadi Abdoun drains to the east, towards Zarqa.

References

Amman